Stoomtrein Katwijk Leiden (formerly Stoomtrein Valkenburgse Meer, abbreviated SVM), is a  narrow gauge heritage railway line around the Valkenburgse Meer in the south of Katwijk, Netherlands. Although the name translates as Steam Train Valkenburg Lake, technically actually trams are used for the tourist attraction. Carriages are mostly remakes of early-20th century tram carriages, built by the Nederlandse Smalspoor Stichting (Netherlands Narrow-gauge Foundation) in Katwijk.

History
The SVM finds its origins in the south dunes of Katwijk. From the starting point Vrieze Wei, not far from the city center, volunteers started in 1973 to operate a steam train line on the tracks formerly used by the dune water company, which abolished the transport of goods using these railways through the dunes. Having bought steam- and diesel locomotives from companies also ceasing their activities on narrow gauge railroads, the passenger carriages were built on site by the volunteers themselves.

Relocation
By the end of the 1980s, Staatsbosbeheer, the owner of the South Dunes, decided that a tramline through the dunes were no longer tolerated. The narrow-gauge foundation decided to create a museum with a heritage tramline. A location was found at the Valkenburgse Meer, in the municipality of Valkenburg (in those days a separate municipality, now part of Katwijk). In 1992, the last ride through the dunes was made, a year later was the first ride around the lake. The museum was opened in 1995, with a major expansion in 2003.

Gallery

See also 
Narrow-gauge railways in the Netherlands

References

Katwijk
Heritage railways in the Netherlands